Benefits.gov (formerly GovBenefits.gov) was launched by the U.S. Department of Labor in April 2002, as a website designed to provide American citizens with access to government benefit eligibility information. Benefits.gov helps citizens determine their potential eligibility for more than 1,000 government-funded benefit and assistance programs.  Visitors can complete an on-line questionnaire, and Benefits.gov matches benefit programs with their needs and provides information on how to apply.

Benefits.gov includes information on a variety of benefit and assistance programs for veterans, seniors, students, teachers, children, people with disabilities, dependents, disaster victims, farmers, caregivers, job seekers, prospective homeowners, and more.

Facts and figures 

Visitors since launch: 105 million
Referrals to partner agencies: 32 million
Average monthly visitors: 1.1 - 1.3 million

Govloans.gov 

Govloans.gov, the sister site of benefits.gov, was launched in 2004, and provides information about government loan programs.  Govloans.gov features information about loans for:
 Housing
 Education
 Agriculture
 Small business
 Veterans
 Disaster relief

References 

 The Facts About the President's Management Agenda. https://georgewbush-whitehouse.archives.gov/results/agenda/PMA-MythFact20061003.html
 Computerworld Honors Program Case Study, 2006. https://web.archive.org/web/20070927104323/http://www.cwheroes.org/case_studies/USDepartmentofLabor.pdf
 Benefits.gov and GovLoans.gov are both available in English and in Spanish.  Benefits.gov en Español and GovLoans en Español offer Spanish-speaking communities greater access to benefit information.

External links
Benefits.gov

United States Department of Labor
Economics websites
Government services web portals in the United States